The Terrorizers is a 1986 drama film by acclaimed Taiwanese filmmaker Edward Yang.

Plot
The film concerns the coincidental interactions between three groups of people in Taipei: a young woman and the tough petty criminal gang of Native Taiwanese she hangs out with; a Mainlander doctor and his novelist wife; and a young photographer who observes the life of the city unfolding around him, in an echo of the protagonist of Michelangelo Antonioni's Blowup.

Cast
Cora Miao as Zhou Yufen, a depressed novelist
Lee Li-chun as Li Lizhong, a hospital professional and Zhou Yufen's husband
Chin Shih-chieh as Shen, Zhou Yufen's ex who owns a company
Wang An as teenaged hustler 
Liu Min as the girl's mother
Yu An-shun as the girl's partner in crime
Ku Pao-ming as Gu, police chief and Li Lizhong's friend
Ma Shao-chun as young photographer from a rich family
Huang Chia-ching as the photographer's girlfriend

Reception and legacy
Terrorizers is a part of the New Taiwan Cinema. "Famously characterized by Marxist scholar Fredric Jameson as the postmodern film, the film was likened by Yang himself to a puzzle where the pleasure lies in rearranging a multitude of relationships between characters, spaces, and genres."

Awards and nominations
1986 Golden Horse Film Festival
Won: Best Feature Film
Nominated: Best Leading Actress – Cora Miao
Nominated: Best Original Screenplay – Hsiao Yeh and Edward Yang
1987 Pesaro Film Festival
Won: Best Director
1987 Locarno International Film Festival
Won: Silver Leopard
1987 British Film Institute Awards
Won: Sutherland Trophy
1987 Asia-Pacific Film Festival
Won: Best Screenplay – Edward Yang, Hsiao Yeh

References

External links

Kanopy

Taiwanese drama films
Films directed by Edward Yang
Films set in Taiwan
Films shot in Taiwan
Central Motion Picture Corporation films